Denise Brewer (born March 30, 1966) is an American politician who served in the Oklahoma House of Representatives from the 71st district from 2018 to 2022. She announced she would retire from office at the end of the 2022 term.

Brewer participated in the 2018 Teacher walkout protests.

References

1966 births
Living people
Democratic Party members of the Oklahoma House of Representatives
21st-century American politicians
21st-century American women politicians
People from Tachikawa
Politicians from Tokyo
Women state legislators in Oklahoma